Diakovce is an old village and municipality in Šaľa District, in the Nitra Region of southwest Slovakia.

Geography
The village lies at an altitude of 118 metres and covers an area of 26.28 km².

History
In historical records the village was first mentioned in 1002 meaning that it is one of the oldest recorded villages in present-day Slovakia. In 1001, Stephen I of Hungary deployed Benedictines here. From that time, the area was the property of the Pannonhalma Abbey. In 1228 a twin-towered Romanesque cathedral, the oldest surviving monument in Slovakia, ever built.

After the Austro-Hungarian army disintegrated in November 1918, Czechoslovak troops occupied the area, later acknowledged internationally by the Treaty of Trianon. Between 1938 and 1945 Diakovce once more became part of Miklós Horthy's Hungary through the First Vienna Award. From 1945 until the Velvet Divorce, it was part of Czechoslovakia. Since then it has been part of Slovakia.

Population
It has a population of about 2235 people. The village is about 72% Magyar and 28% Slovak.

Facilities
The village has a public library, a gym a swimming pool and a football pitch.

Genealogical resources

The records for genealogical research are available at the state archive "Statny Archiv in Bratislava, Nitra, Slovakia"

 Roman Catholic church records (births/marriages/deaths): 1700-1894 (parish A)
 Reformated church records (births/marriages/deaths): 1792-1896 (parish A)

See also
 List of municipalities and towns in Slovakia

References

External links
2005 data
Surnames of living people in Diakovce

Villages and municipalities in Šaľa District
Hungarian communities in Slovakia